Kedleston Beach is a hamlet in Saskatchewan.

Dufferin No. 190, Saskatchewan
Unincorporated communities in Saskatchewan
Division No. 6, Saskatchewan